The UCL Department of Economics is one of nine Departments and Institutes within the Faculty of Social and Historical Sciences at University College London. It is the oldest department of economics in England and is research-intensive, currently headed by Professor Antonio Guarino.

History

In 1824, Jean-Baptiste Say expressed his enthusiasm for the creation of a Chair of Political Economy in London in a letter to Jeremy Bentham, reading:
“Joseph Hume tells me that you are going to establish a Chair of Political Economy in London. Bravo! Teach where the true national interests lie, and those who set personal interests against them will not have it easy”.
Bentham was a significant influence on the creation of UCL, often described as its ‘spiritual father’, and Hume was a member of the college’s original council.

The Chair of Political Economy at UCL was created in 1828 in memory of David Ricardo, establishing the first Department of Economics in England. The first holder of the Chair was John Ramsay McCulloch. William Stanley Jevons held a professorship of economics at UCL between 1876 and 1880.

Research
In the 2014 Research Excellence Framework (REF2014), the Department received an overall grade-point average of 3.78 (out of 4) - the highest of any department in Economics and Econometrics, or any field, in the UK.

REF2014 also showed that 79% of all indicators of output were rated at the highest 4* level.

Research centres and publications
The department is currently involved with numerous research centres and publications:
Centre for Microdata Methods and Practice (CEMMAP) — directed by Andrew Chesher
Centre for the Microeconomic Analysis of Public Policy (CPP) — directed by Richard Blundell
Centre for Finance — directed by Antonio Guarino
Centre for Macroeconomics — co-directed by Morten Ravn
Centre for Research and Analysis of Migration (CReAM) — directed by Christian Dustmann and Ian Preston
Centre for Teaching and Learning in Economics (CTaLE) — directed by Parama Chaudhury, and cofounded by Parama Chaudhury, Cloda Jenkins, and Frank Witte
Microeconomic Insights — Editorial board including Orazio Attanasio and Richard Blundell
CORE (Curriculum Open access Resources in Economics) — cofounded by Wendy Carlin
James M. and Cathleen D. Stone Centre on Wealth Concentration, Inequality and the Economy – directed by Wendy Carlin and Imran Rasul

Relationship with the IFS

The Department has forged a close relationship with the nearby Institute of Fiscal Studies, with many Professors holding positions at both institutions, a high degree of research collaboration, and regular talks given by faculty members at each institution.

Director of the IFS, Paul Johnson, is currently serving as a visiting professor at the department.

Rankings
In the 2021 Complete University Guide, the programme is ranked fourth nationally, reentering the top five where it had been consistently from 2008 to 2020.

The Tilburg University Economics Ranking is a worldwide ranking of Economics schools based on research contribution placing UCL third in Europe, and 15th globally.
Similarly, the Academic Ranking of World Universities sees UCL place fourth in Europe, and 16th globally.

The 2020 Times Higher Education World University Rankings places UCL fourth in Europe for Economics, and 15th globally.

In the 2021 QS World University Rankings by subject, UCL is ranked fourth in Europe, and 16th globally for Economics & Econometrics.

The Economist’s Society
The Economist’s Society is the Official Departmental Student Society, run by an elected student committee for the undergraduate population of the Economics Department. All undergraduates of the Department are automatically members.
The Society puts on numerous academic and social events throughout the academic year, including a Speaker Series, the UCL Economics Conference, the inter-university Economics Debate, and the flagship social event ‘The David Ricardo Ball’.

Notably, the Society hosted Mark Carney as he gave his last public speech as Governor of the Bank of England on 5 March 2020 in the Institute of Education’s Logan Hall.

The Economic Tribune, the quarterly Official UCL Economics Magazine, is published by the Senior Editorial Team of the Society.

Notable current faculty

Notable alumni and former faculty

See also

UCL Faculty of Social and Historical Sciences
Institute for Fiscal Studies
London School of Economics

References

External links
UCL Faculty of Social and Historical Sciences
University College London

Departments of University College London
University College London
1828 establishments in England
1828 in London